The Glass Museum of Hsinchu City is a museum of glass art in East District, Hsinchu City, Taiwan.

History
The museum building was originally constructed in 1936 for lodging and resting of Japanese royal family and government officials when they visit Taiwan. The building was converted into the Glass Museum of Hsinchu City on 18 December 1999.

Objectives
The museum has the following objectives:

 Combine cultural and sightseeing resources to help promoting the glass industry of Hsinchu
 Let the public and business personnel participate in and understand the exploration and application of the glass industry in Hsinchu

Architecture
The museum building retains its European style of oriental modern architecture through the standing bricks on the southeast corner of the building and the classical image of the foyer.

Service functions
The museum has the following functions:

 Administration
 Exhibition
 Collection
 Educational learning
 Public service

Transportation
The museum is accessible within walking distance east from Hsinchu Station of Taiwan Railways.

See also
 List of museums in Taiwan

References

1999 establishments in Taiwan
Art museums and galleries in Taiwan
Buildings and structures completed in 1936
Decorative arts museums
Glass museums in Taiwan
Museums established in 1999
Museums in Hsinchu